Laru Sar (also Romanized as Lārū Sar) is a village in Kuhestan Rural District, Kelardasht District, Chalus County, Mazandaran Province, Iran. At the 2006 census, its population was 43, in 12 families.

References 

Populated places in Chalus County